Teodora Măgurean (born 14 March 1998) is a Romanian handballer who plays for Hypo Niederösterreich.

References

1998 births
Living people
Romanian female handball players
People from Baia Mare
Expatriate handball players
Romanian expatriates in Austria